Sudama is a village in Iglas Tehsil of Aligarh district in the Indian state of Uttar Pradesh.

References 

Villages in Aligarh district